CJME is a radio station in Regina, Saskatchewan, Canada, broadcasting at 980 kHz. Its format is news/talk. It shares studios with sister stations CIZL-FM and CKCK-FM at 2401 Saskatchewan Drive in Regina.

History 
CJME was founded and signed on the air on November 25, 1959, by a group of businessmen led by J. Marsh Ellis, a former radio salesman. Its original format was easy listening, but the station was not successful until it began playing top 40 music in 1963.

In 1967, CJME was purchased by the Rawlinson family, owners of CKBI radio and CKBI-TV in Prince Albert. Their company later came to be called Rawlco Communications.

Continuing its successful top 40 format, the station was renamed as CJME Power 13 in early 1987.

During its 25th anniversary of being a top 40 station on April 7, 1988; a random mix of former songs from the '60s, '70s, and '80s started to mix in for a short time, although still continued to air a strong top 40 focus.

By the 1990s the station's format had evolved from Top 40 to oldies.

In 1998, CJME relaunched as News Talk CJME, forming a network with Saskatoon station CKOM, then known as NTR.

At midnight on September 7, 1998, the last song played on CJME was "American Pie" by Don McLean, then the station stunted a loop recording of "a new station is coming" for an entire day.

At 5:30AM on September 8, 1998, CJME was relaunched as a news/talk radio station.

In 2001, CJME moved from their longtime position at 1300 kHz to the 980 kHz frequency.

On September 11, 2006, the station changed its on-air brand from 980 CJME to News Talk 980.

In late 2008, the station added the CJME call letters back to its on-air brand, becoming known as 'News Talk 980 CJME'.

On September 29, 2009, CJME applied to add new FM rebroadcasters to extend its coverage into south Saskatchewan. The new transmitters would be located at Gravelbourg (107.1), Swift Current (101.7) and Warmley (107.3), all with the ERP of 100,000 watts. This application received CRTC approval on February 26, 2010.

Rebroadcasters

Programming

Most of CJME's weekday lineup is shared with its Saskatoon sister station CKOM, aside from a local morning show (hosted on CJME by Greg Morgan, with news anchor Kevin Martel). Its daytime lineup consists of Gormley, which is followed by Saskatchewan Afternoon from 12:30-2:00. It's a comprehensive look at the day's stories so far and features some of the best of the day's programming.

The Green Zone with Jamie and Wheels" airs from 2:00-6:00, a daily Sports Talk show. Award winning sports person Jamie Nye and multiple local Emmy-winning broadcaster and former NHL coach Drew Remenda are joined regularly by some of the biggest names in sports in Saskatchewan and beyond.

At 6PM, it's "The Day in Review," an in-depth wrap on the day's biggest stories, as well as business, and the best of the day's shows.

CJME has won dozens of national and regional awards, including multiple Best Radio Newscast awards, as well as recognition for Breaking News coverage, Feature Reporting, Ongoing Coverage, Investigative Reporting, Special Event coverage and Commentary.

The station devotes a significant amount of coverage to the CFL's Saskatchewan Roughriders, which includes coverage preceding and following each game.

Current and former on-air personalities 
 Greg Morgan
 John Gormley
 Jamie Nye
 Murray Wood
 Sarah Mills
 Stu Jeffries
 Drew Remenda
 Dave Arnold
 Harry Dekker
 Darren Lamb
 Hart Kirsch
 Craig Peters

References

External links
News Talk 980 CJME
 

Jme
Jme
Jme
Radio stations established in 1959
1959 establishments in Saskatchewan